A Hologram for the King is a 2016 comedy-drama film written, directed and co-scored by Tom Tykwer, based on the 2012 novel of the same name written by Dave Eggers, and starring Tom Hanks as a washed-up corporate salesman, who goes to Saudi Arabia to propose a business deal.

Sidse Babett Knudsen, Tom Skerritt and Sarita Choudhury also star in this international co-production between France, Germany, the Cayman Islands, Mexico, and the United States. The film was released on April 22, 2016, by Lionsgate, Roadside Attractions and Saban Films.

Plot

American salesman Alan Clay is sent to sell a holographic teleconferencing system to the Saudi government by overseeing a presentation for the King of Saudi Arabia. Clay was offered the job solely because he once met a nephew of the King. Clay is haunted by a previous job in which outsourced production led to several hundred layoffs and, in the long run, financial ruin. He is also depressed because of a messy and costly divorce which leaves him unable to financially support his daughter Kit.

Oversleeping on the first day due to jet lag, he misses the shuttle bus to his sales presentation and rents a car. The driver, Yousef, tells him that he is in contact with a woman whose wealthy and jealous husband has led him to fear for his life. After arriving, Clay is informed that neither the King nor his direct contact, Karim Al-Ahmed, are there. Clay's team is placed in a tent outside the office building lacking food or internet access.

Over the following few days Clay repeatedly oversleeps and calls Yousef to drive him to the development, both becoming closer during the long drives. At the development, he is repeatedly put off and confined to the tent. One day, he slips inside the building and meets Danish executive Hanne. She is sympathetic to his plight but cannot help him get contact the King or Karim Al-Ahmed. She offers him alcohol disguised as olive oil, which Clay has missed since arriving in Saudi Arabia.

In the evening, Clay gets drunk and tries to cut open a lump on his back. Waking the next day, covered with blood from the cut, he goes to a hospital, where he meets his doctor, Zahra, resulting in an immediate connection. She performs a biopsy and asks him to return in a few days. After more days without progress, Clay is invited by Hanne to a party at the Danish consulate, where she unsuccessfully tries to seduce him. The next day, after the tent's air conditioning breaks down, Clay becomes upset. He again slips into the office building and finally meets Karim Al-Ahmed. Clay tells Karim about all his grievances. Karim assures him that he will take care of the problems but cannot give him a date for the presentation.

Shortly after, Clay has a panic attack in the hotel and, mistaking it for a stroke, calls Zahra and Yousef. Yousef, arriving shortly after Zahra, notices how close they are and, after she leaves, chastises Alan for endangering her by making advances to her, something Clay vehemently denies. Yousef confesses that the jealous husband has threatened him. He flees to his home town over the weekend to let things cool down, and Clay accompanies him.

After returning, Clay learns his lump contains precancerous cells and should be removed the next day. When returning to the development, Clay notices the technical problems have been resolved, and he gives the King his presentation. However, Clay sees the officials talking with a Chinese company who can offer a better product at a cheaper rate. It is implied the government had always planned to make a deal with the Chinese and knowingly wasted Clay's time. Afterwards, Clay again rejects Hanne's advances.

The next day, the operation begins with an unknown doctor but, at the last moment, Zahra takes over, to Clay's delight. After the procedure, Clay and Zahra exchange increasingly personal and intimate e-mails, which culminate in a secret meeting. They talk about their families, and Zahra explains she has children and is going through a messy divorce. They are driven to Zahra's beach house, where they go swimming and have sex. Clay writes to Kit, telling her that the deal was unsuccessful, but he has taken a well-paid job in Saudi Arabia, and he has found a new positive force in his life.

Cast

Production

Development
On June 12, 2013, Tom Tykwer was reported to be developing an adaptation of 2012 novel A Hologram for the King, written by Dave Eggers. Tykwer wrote and directed the film, which stars Tom Hanks as the lead. The film was made by Playtone, Primeridian Entertainment, and X-Filme Creative Pool. On September 5, 2013, Lotus Entertainment began licensing international rights to the film. On March 6, 2014 it was announced that Sarita Choudhury, Alexander Black, Tracey Fairaway, David Menkin, and Tom Skerritt had joined the cast of the film. Iconic hologram pioneer Mani Shankar was heavily consulted in the design; he asked to not have his name credited but Tom Hanks acknowledged his contributions in several interviews.

Filming
Production was set to begin in first quarter of 2014. Principal photography commenced on March 6, 2014 in Morocco. Filming also took place in Hurghada in Egypt, as well as in Berlin and Düsseldorf in Germany. Shooting wrapped in June 2014.

Reception

Critical response
Writing for The New York Times, Stephen Holden called the movie "a story of confusion, perplexity, frustration and panic," praising Tom Hanks's ability to turn it into "an agreeably uncomfortable comedy," meriting a "Critic's Pick" designation.  On Rotten Tomatoes, the film has a rating of 70% based on 150 reviews and an average rating of 6.20/10. The site's critical consensus reads, "A Hologram for the King amiably ambles through a narrative desert, saved by an oasis of a performance from the ever-dependable Tom Hanks." On Metacritic, the film has a score of 58 out of 100 based on 35 critics, indicating "mixed or average reviews".

Box office
Released alongside The Huntsman: Winter's War and Elvis & Nixon on April 26, 2016. A Hologram for the King made $1.1 million in its opening weekend, finishing 11th at the box office. With a total worldwide gross of $8,244,651 (U.S. domestic gross of $4,212,494), it is the lowest-grossing film to feature Tom Hanks in top billing since Every Time We Say Goodbye in 1986.

References

External links
 
 
 
 
 

2016 films
2016 comedy-drama films
American comedy-drama films
Mexican comedy-drama films
French comedy-drama films
German comedy-drama films
English-language French films
English-language German films
English-language Mexican films
Films set in Saudi Arabia
Films based on American novels
Films shot in Germany
Films shot in Morocco
Holography in films
Playtone films
Saban Films films
Lionsgate films
Icon Productions films
Films based on works by Dave Eggers
Films directed by Tom Tykwer
Films scored by Tom Tykwer
Films scored by Johnny Klimek
Films produced by Gary Goetzman
Films about telepresence
2010s English-language films
2010s American films
2010s French films
2010s German films
2010s Mexican films
Films about salespeople